Pennsylvania v. Finley, 481 U.S. 551 (1987), was a United States Supreme Court case involving the right to counsel.

See also
 List of United States Supreme Court cases, volume 476
 List of United States Supreme Court cases
 Lists of United States Supreme Court cases by volume
 List of United States Supreme Court cases by the Rehnquist Court

External links
 

United States Sixth Amendment appointment of counsel case law
United States Supreme Court cases
United States Supreme Court cases of the Rehnquist Court
1987 in United States case law